Gadžin Han is a village and municipality located in the Nišava District of the southern Serbia. According to 2011 census, the municipality has 8,389 inhabitants, from which 1,223 live in Gadžin Han itself.

Geography
The municipality borders Bela Palanka municipality and City of Niš in the north, Babušnica municipality in the south-east, Vlasotince and Leskovac municipalities in the south, and Doljevac municipality in the west.

Settlements
Aside from the town of Gadžin Han, the municipality includes the following settlements:

 Čagrovac
 Ćelije
 Donje Dragovlje
 Donji Barbeš
 Donji Dušnik
 Duga Poljana
 Dukat
 Gare
 Gornje Dragovlje
 Gornje Vlase
 Gornji Barbeš
 Gornji Dušnik
 Grkinja
 Jagličje
 Kaletinac
 Koprivnica (Gadžin Han)
 Krastavče
 Ličje
 Mali Krčimir
 Mali Vrtop
 Marina Kutina
 Miljkovac
 Novo Selo
 Ovsinjinac
 Ravna Dubrava
 Semče
 Sopotnica
 Šebet
 Taskovići
 Toponica
 Veliki Krčimir
 Veliki Vrtop
 Vilandrica

Demographics

According to the last official census done in 2011, the municipality of Gadžin Han has 8,389 inhabitants.

Ethnic groups
The ethnic composition of the municipality:

Economy
The following table gives a preview of total number of employed people per their core activity (as of 2017):

See also
 Nišava District
 Subdivisions of Serbia

References

External links

 

Populated places in Nišava District
Municipalities and cities of Southern and Eastern Serbia